Marco Polo was a 13th-century Italian explorer.

Marco Polo may also refer to:

People 
 Marco Polo (producer) (born 1979), Canadian hip hop producer
 Marco Polo Del Nero (born 1941), Brazilian sports administrator
 Mark di Suvero (born Marco Polo di Suvero in 1933), sculptor

Places 
 Marco Polo (crater), on the Moon
 Marco Polo House, a now-demolished office building in London
 Marco Polo Park, a defunct 1970s theme park in Florida
 Venice Marco Polo Airport, an airport in Venice, Italy
 Marco Polo Bridge, southwest of Beijing, China
 The Marco Polo high-rise condominium, Honolulu, Hawaii, the site of a 2017 fire

Media and entertainment

Film 
 Marco Polo (1962 film), starring Rory Calhoun
 Marco Polo (2007 film), a TV film

Music 
 Marco Polo Fest, a Croatian music festival
 Marco Polo (opera), 1996, by Tan Dun
 Marco Polo – The Journey, a 1992 album by Ensemble Renaissance
 Marco Polo, a 1998 EP by Blueboy
 "Marco Polo" (Bow Wow song), 2008
 "Marco Polo", a single by Loreena McKennitt from her album The Book of Secrets
 "Marco Polo", a 1981 song by Harry Sacksioni
 "The Marco Polo", a song by The Spinners

Television 
 Marco Polo (Doctor Who), a 1964 television serial
 Marco Polo (miniseries), a 1982 American-Italian television mini-series
 Marco Polo (TV series), a 2014 American Netflix drama
 "Marco Polo" (Modern Family), a television episode
 "Marco Polo" (The Sopranos), a television episode

Space missions 
 Marco Polo (spacecraft), a proposed asteroid mission
 Marcopolo, either of two 1980s communications satellites

Transport

Ships
 Marco Polo (1851 ship), a clipper
 Marco Polo, former name of the Yugoslav and Montenegrin training ship Jadran
 CMA CGM Marco Polo, a container ship
 Italian cruiser Marco Polo, an 1890s warship
 , a cruise ship
 , a cargo ship later serving in World War II as the USS Mount Hood (AE-11)
 TS Marco Polo II, a proposed name of TS Maxim Gorkiy

Other
 Lamborghini Marco Polo, a car design
 Marcopolo S.A., a Brazilian bus manufacturer
 Tata Marcopolo, Indian subsidiary
 MarcoPolo Airways, an Afghani airline

Other uses 
 Marco Polo (game), a swimming game
 Marco Polo (app), a video messaging and video hosting service
 Fronte Marco Polo, a Venetian political party
 Marco Polo Cycling Club, an online forum
 Marco Polo Cycling–Donckers Koffie, a former Hong Kong/Chinese/Ethiopian cycling team
 Marco Polo Hotels, based in Hong Kong
 Marco Polo Ortigas Manila, Philippines
 The Marco Polo sheep of Central Asia
 Marc O'Polo, a fashion label

See also 

 The Travels of Marco Polo, a book of stories by Marco Polo
 Marc O'Polo, a fashion label
 The Adventures of Marco Polo, a 1938 film directed by John Ford, starring Gary Cooper
 La pietra di Marco Polo, a 1982-1983 Italian television series
 Marco the Magnificent, also known as La fabuleuse aventure de Marco Polo, a 1965 film starring Horst Buchholz
 Marco Polo, if You Can, a 1982 novel by William F. Buckley
 The Marco Polo Bridge Incident
 Colias marcopolo (C. marcopolo), a butterfly species
 Maurizio De Jorio (born 1968), Italian-American singer who has recorded as "Marko Polo"
 
 Polo (disambiguation)
 Marco (disambiguation)

Polo, Marco